The 1912 Auburn Tigers football team represented Auburn University (then called the Alabama Polytechnic Institute) in the 1912 college football season. It was the Tigers' 21st season and they competed as a member of the Southern Intercollegiate Athletic Association (SIAA). The team was led by head coach Mike Donahue, in his eighth year, and played their home games at Drake Field in Auburn, Alabama. They finished with a record of six wins, one loss and one tie (6–1–1 overall).

Schedule

References

Auburn
Auburn Tigers football seasons
Auburn Tigers football